Pyatizvyozdnaya (Russian пятизвёздная: "with five stars" (the highest grade in the school)) is a Russian vodka produced by the Saint Petersburg based distillery  LIVIZ.

External links 

liviz.ru - the distillery Liviz

Russian vodkas